Eaton County is a county in the U.S. state of Michigan. As of the 2020 United States Census, the population was 109,175. The county seat is Charlotte. The county was organized in 1837 and was named for John Eaton, who was Secretary of War under U.S. President Andrew Jackson, making it one of Michigan's Cabinet counties. Eaton County is included in the Lansing-East Lansing, Metropolitan Statistical area in Central Michigan.

History
Eaton County was formed in 1837 from open territory. It was named after John H. Eaton, an American Secretary of War. The county is one of the so-called Cabinet counties because it was named after a member of the cabinet of US President Andrew Jackson.

Eaton County was created by the Michigan Territorial Legislature on October 29, 1829: "That as much of the country as is included within the following limits, viz., north of the base line and south of the line between townships four and five north of the base line, and east of the line between ranges six and seven west of the meridian, and west of the line between ranges two and three west of the meridian, be and the same is set off into a separate county, and the name thereof shall be Eaton." The county was named in honor of Gen. John H. Eaton, secretary of war in the cabinet of President Andrew Jackson. The following week (November 4), the legislature added this directive: "That the county of Eaton shall be attached to and compose a part of the county of St. Joseph." On November 5, they also added an act to direct that the counties of Eaton, Branch and Calhoun, and all the country north attached to Eaton be set off into a township by the name of Eaton, and it was ordered that the first town meeting should be held at the house of Jabez Bronson, who lived on the site of the present village of Bronson in Branch county. This was no hardship, for there was not at that time a single white settler within the bounds of Eaton county.

The following summer (July 30, 1830), the Territorial Legislature changed Eaton's assignment, attaching it to Kalamazoo for administrative, revenue, and judicial purposes. Then on March 17, 1835, it directed: "That the county of Eaton shall be a township of Belleville,' and the first township meeting shall be held at such place as the sheriff of Calhoun county shall appoint in said county of Eaton, and shall be attached to the county of Eaton for all judicial purposes."

By 1837 the Territory had been admitted to the Union as a State. On December 29 of that year, the new state legislature created Eaton County as an independent entity: "That the county of Eaton be and the same is hereby organized, and the inhabitants thereof entitled to all the rights and privileges to which by law the inhabitants of other counties of this state are entitled."

While the name "Belleville" was given to the first organized township, including the whole county, it does not appear to have been used in any official documents. The second place where the name of the township is mentioned in a legislative enactment is on March 17 in the session laws of 1837, where it appears under the name of "Bellevue." Official business has always been transacted under the latter name, and yet there is no known law showing that the name has ever been legally changed from "Belleville."

The first division of the town of Bellevue occurred on March 11, 1837, when Eaton and Vermontville were organized. The four northwestern townships, now Vermontville, Chester, Roxand and Sunfield, were set off as a township and named Vermontville; while the four southeastern townships, now Eaton, Eaton Rapids, Hamlin, and Brookfield were organized as the township of Eaton.

This left the four northeastern towns, Benton, Oneida, Delta, and Windsor, and the four remaining towns, Bellevue, Kalamo, Carmel, and Walton, cornering at the geographical center of the county in a single organized township known as Bellevue. But on March 6, 1838, the northeast quarter of the county was detached from Bellevue and was formed as the town of Oneida.

In 1832, a surveyor, George W. Barnes, bought a homestead in central Eaton County; that area is now contained in Charlotte. On March 21, 1833, he applied to Territorial Governor George B. Porter for a commission to be appointed to locate the county seat: "That in the month of may last he put up in three public places in the county of Kalamazoo notices that application would be made to the governor of the territory of Michigan to appoint commissioners to locate a seat of justice for Eaton County, agreeably to the law in such cases made and provided." Accordingly, three locals (Charles C. Hascall, Stillman Blanchard, John W. Strong) were named on April 29. On June 5 they reported to the Governor that they met "at Prairie Ronde [Round] in the county of Kalamazoo on the 27th day of May, 1833, and on June 4, located the county seat on land which is owned by George W. Barnes. The point selected for the seat of justice in this county is on a beautiful prairie, about one mile square, near two and a half miles south of the center of the county, and about one mile north of the Battle creek, the nearest point to the center of the county where water can be obtained for hydraulic purposes."

Geography

Rivers
 Battle Creek River
 Grand River
 Thornapple River

Adjacent counties
 Clinton County – northeast
 Ingham County – east
 Jackson County – southeast
 Calhoun County - south
 Barry County – west
 Ionia County – northwest

Transportation

Major highways

Airports
 Fitch H. Beach Airport - general aviation airport in Charlotte.
 Capital Region International Airport in Clinton County, Michigan, northeast of Eaton County – airline service.
 Rapids Airway Airport (light aviation, grass field, private use only) - two miles (3.2 km) NE of Eaton Rapids.

Demographics

As of the 2010 United States Census, there were 107,759 people living in the county. 87.8% were White, 6.3% Black or African American, 1.7% Asian, 0.4% Native American, 1.2% of some other race and 2.6% of two or more races. 4.7% were Hispanic or Latino (of any race). 24.2% were of English ancestry, 22.9% were of German ancestry and 9.3% were of Irish ancestry.

As of the 2000 United States Census, there were 103,655 people, 40,167 households, and 28,237 families in the county. There were 42,118 housing units at an average density of 73 per square mile (28/km2). The racial makeup of the county was 90.25% White, 5.29% Black or African American, 0.44% Native American, 1.13% Asian, 0.03% Pacific Islander, 1.17% from other races, and 1.70% from two or more races. 3.21% of the population were Hispanic or Latino of any race. 95.6% spoke only English, while 2.0% spoke Spanish.

There were 40,167 households, out of which 33.80% had children under the age of 18 living with them, 56.30% were married couples living together, 10.30% had a female householder with no husband present, and 29.70% were non-families. 24.50% of all households were made up of individuals, and 8.40% had someone living alone who was 65 years of age or older. The average household size was 2.54 and the average family size was 3.03.

The county population contained 26.10% under the age of 18, 9.10% from 18 to 24, 28.80% from 25 to 44, 24.60% from 45 to 64, and 11.30% who were 65 years of age or older.  The median age was 36 years. For every 100 females, there were 94.60 males. For every 100 females age 18 and over, there were 91.50 males.

The median income for a household in the county was $49,588, and the median income for a family was $57,898. Males had a median income of $41,978 versus $29,638 for females. The per capita income for the county was $22,411. About 4.10% of families and 5.80% of the population were below the poverty line, including 6.80% of those under age 18 and 5.90% of those age 65 or over.

Government

Eaton County has been reliably Republican for most of its history. Since 1884, the Republican Party nominee has carried the county vote in 80% of the elections (27 of 34 elections) for president.  However, population growth in Lansing and the surrounding area has made the county more competitive in recent years.  Barack Obama carried the county in both 2008 and 2012, as did Michigan governor Jennifer Granholm, a Democrat, in her winning gubernatorial campaigns of 2002 and 2006.  In 2014, Republican governor Rick Snyder narrowly lost the county while winning statewide. Donald Trump won by narrow margins in both 2016 and 2020.

The county government operates the jail, maintains rural roads, operates the major local courts, records deeds, mortgages, and vital records, administers public health regulations, and participates with the state in the provision of social services. The county
board of commissioners controls the budget and has limited authority to make laws or ordinances. In Michigan, most local government functions — police and fire, building and zoning, tax assessment, street maintenance, etc. — are the responsibility of individual cities and townships.

Elected officials

 Prosecuting Attorney: Doug Lloyd (R)
 Sheriff: Tom Reich (D)
 County Clerk/Register of Deeds: Diana Bosworth (R)
 County Treasurer: Bob Robinson, APR (D)
 Drain Commissioner: Richard Wagner (R)
 Circuit Court Judge: Jan Cunningham
 Circuit Court Judge: John Maurer
 Probate Court Judge: Thomas K. Byerley

County Board of Commissioners
15 members, elected from districts (8 Republicans, 7 Democrats)

Education
School districts located in Eaton County:

 Bellevue Community Schools, Bellevue
 Charlotte Public Schools, Charlotte
 Eaton Intermediate School District, Charlotte
 Eaton Rapids Public Schools, Eaton Rapids
 Grand Ledge Public Schools, Grand Ledge.  Village of Mulliken schools was annexed by Grand Ledge Public Schools
 Maple Valley Schools, Vermontville
 Olivet Community Schools, Olivet
 Oneida Township S/D #3, Oneida Township
 Potterville Public Schools, Potterville
 Roxand Township School District #12, Roxand Township
 Waverly Community Schools, Delta Township

Some county residents attend out-of-county schools:

 Village of Dimondale (Holt Public Schools, Holt, Ingham County)
 Village of Sunfield (Lakewood Public Schools, Lake Odessa, Ionia County)
 A small portion of northeast Delta Township (Lansing Public Schools, Lansing, Ingham County)
 Ingham Intermediate School District (Waverly Community Schools, Village of Dimondale, portion of Delta Township)
 Ionia Intermediate School District (Village of Sunfield)
 Calhoun Intermediate School District ( Bellevue Community Schools, Olivet Community Schools)

Communities

Cities

 Charlotte (county seat)
 Eaton Rapids
 Grand Ledge
 Lansing (partial)
 Olivet
 Potterville

Villages

 Bellevue
 Dimondale
 Mulliken
 Sunfield
 Vermontville

Census-designated place
 Waverly

Other unincorporated communities

 Ainger (called Thurman in 1887)
 Bismark
 Brookfield
 Canada Settlement
 Carlisle (called Hyde's Mills until 1843)
 Charlesworth
 Chester
 Clinton Junction
 Delta Center
 Delta Mills (originally called Grand River City)
 Delwood
 East Walton
 Elmira
 Five Points Corner
 Gresham
 Hoytville
 Kalamo
 Kelly
 Kingsland
 Little Venice
 Millett (originally called Millett's Station)
 Moore's Station
 Needmore
 Oneida Center
 Packard
 Petrieville
 Shaytown
 Stalls Corner
 Walton (called East Bellevue until 1840)
 West Benton
 West Windsor
 Woodbury

Townships

 Bellevue Township
 Benton Township
 Brookfield Township
 Carmel Township
 Chester Township
 Delta Charter Township
 Eaton Rapids Township
 Eaton Township
 Hamlin Township
 Kalamo Township
 Oneida Charter Township
 Roxand Township
 Sunfield Township
 Vermontville Township
 Walton Township
 Windsor Charter Township

See also
 List of Michigan State Historic Sites in Eaton County, Michigan
 National Register of Historic Places listings in Eaton County, Michigan

References

External links
 Official Website of Eaton County
 History of Eaton County
 

 
Michigan counties
Lansing–East Lansing metropolitan area
1837 establishments in Michigan
Populated places established in 1837